Bernard Reymond (7 January 1933) is a Swiss pastor and theologian, honorary professor of practical theology at the Romand pastoral Institute of the University of Lausanne, which belongs to the current of Liberal Christianity.

Biography 
In 1975, Bernard Reymond supported a thesis on theologian Louis Auguste Sabatier entitled Le Procès de l'autorité dans la théologie d'Auguste Sabatier and translated a book by  Friedrich Schleiermacher. 

He was a pastor at the Oratoire du Louvre in Paris, then in the canton de Vaud.

In his works, Bernard Reymond particularly studies the links between religion and culture in its various forms: literature, fine arts, cinema.

He was at the origin of the International Society for Practical Theology, founded in 1992.

Publications 
 Protestantisme et littérature
 (with collab. of Marie-Claude Baatard), La Femme du pasteur : un sacerdoce obligé ?, Geneva; éditions du Cerf, Paris, 1991 
 Sur la trace des théologies libérales, Van Dieren, 2002
 Le Protestantisme et ses pasteurs : une belle histoire bientôt finie ?, Genève, Labor et Fides, 2007 
 Dieu survivra-t-il au dernier homme ? Essai sur la religion de l'Homo sapiens, Labor et Fides, 2012
 Auguste Sabatier : un théologien à l'air libre (1839-1901), Labor et Fides
 Le Protestantisme et le Cinéma : les enjeux d'une rencontre tardive et stimulante, Labor et Fides
 Le Protestantisme et Calvin : que faire d'un aïeul si encombrant ?, Labor et Fides
 Le Protestantisme et la Musique : musicalité de la parole
 Théâtre et christianisme
 Le Protestantisme et les Images : pour en finir avec quelques clichés
 De vive voix : oraliture et prédication, Labor et Fides, 
 Entre la grâce et la loi : introduction au droit ecclésial protestant, Labor et Fides
 (Translation) Friedrich Daniel Ernst Schleiermacher, De la religion. Discours aux personnes cultivées d'entre ses mépriseurs (1799)
 La Théologie pratique : statuts, méthodes, perspectives d'avenir, Congrès international œcuménique et francophone de théologie pratique,

References

External links
 Presentation of Bernard Reymond

Swiss Protestant theologians
1933 births
Living people